Hirschl is a German surname. Notable people with the surname include:

Adolf Hirémy-Hirschl, Hungarian artist
Friedrich Hirschl (born 1888), Austrian footballer
Milton Hirschl (1917–1999), American artist
Nickolaus Hirschl, Austrian sport wrestler
Ran Hirschl (born 1963), Canadian political scientist
Tamar Hirschl, Croatian-American artist

See also 
 Ivica Hiršl,  Croatian communist and Mayor of Koprivnica
 Hirsch (disambiguation)
 Hersch

German-language surnames